The Amarillo Venom were a professional indoor football team based in Amarillo, Texas. They played their home games at the Amarillo Civic Center. The Venom began play in 2004 as the Amarillo Dusters, a charter member of the Intense Football League, a small indoor football league based in Texas. They won the championship in their first and only season with the Intense Football League. 

In 2005, the Dusters became the first team to leave the Intense Football League and join the AF2, the minor league of the Arena Football League, where they played for four seasons until the AF2's folding in 2009. At that point, the team held a fan vote as to whether to join some of their AF2 brethren in the new Arena Football 1 (later gaining rights to the name as Arena Football League) or enjoy numerous Texas rivalries in the Indoor Football League. In 2009, it was announced that the Dusters would be moving to the Indoor Football League for the 2010 season. It was then announced that the Dusters would have to be renamed because the Arena Football League owned the rights to the Dusters name and logo and the team became the Venom.

The Venom then joined the Lone Star Football League for the 2012 season, which eventually merged into Champions Indoor Football (CIF) prior to the 2015 season. Prior to the 2021 season, the Venom withdrew from the CIF and later formed the Arena Football Association for the 2022 season. However, the team suspended operations in February 2022.

The team was featured on an episode of Only in America, a show that aired on the Discovery Times channel.

History

Amarillo Dusters (2004–2009)

Expansion championship (2004)
The Amarillo Dusters were led by head coach Don Carthel and finished their only season in the Intense Football League with a 13–3 record en route to a league championship over the Lubbock Lone Stars. The Dusters left the league to play in the AF2 the following season.

Move to AF2 (2005–2009)
In their first year in the AF2, the Amarillo Dusters reached the playoffs with an 8–8 record, which was good enough for a wildcard. The Dusters, quarterbacked by Julian Reese, came from 21 points down at the start of the fourth quarter to win Round 1 over the Oklahoma City Yard Dawgz. The Dusters fell in Round 2 to the eventual champion Memphis Xplorers.

The Dusters tried to build on the moderate success they had in 2005. However, in 2006, the team suffered many injuries and failed to make it to the AF2 playoffs. Quarterback Steve Panella was injured early in the season, forcing numerous backups to take the job. They ended the season with a 4–12 record. Carthel left to take the head coaching job at West Texas A&M two games into the Dusters first AF2 season.

For 2007, Steve Perdue took over the head coaching job and lead the team playoffs and a first round victory over the Oklahoma City Yard Dawgs. Looking to rebound after the previous losing season, injuries plagued the Dusters' offense. After a win against the Lubbock Renegades the Dusters struggled for the remainder of the year but were still able end the Quincy Carter-led Bossier-Shreveport Battle Wings' perfect season with a 51–49 upset.

On July 5, 2008, Dusters running back Donte Newsome was shot to death outside of a nightclub in Huntington, West Virginia, home of his alma mater Marshall University.

In 2008, under the leadership of head coach Chris MacKeown and quarterback Julian Reese, the Amarillo Dusters went 10–9 and played for the AF2 National Conference ArenaCup Finals. Following the Dusters most successful season in their AF2 history, MacKeown moved up to the Arena Football League as the offensive coordinator for John Elway's Colorado Crush.

On December 21, 2008, the Dusters introduced a new color scheme for the team with crimson, grey, and black.

Amarillo Venom (2010–2022)

Moving to the IFL (2010–2011)

With the AF2 breaking up and its larger market teams moving to the newly reformed Arena Football League, the Dusters were forced to find a new league. On October 9, 2009, it was announced that, because of a 65–35 percent margin in the fan vote, the Dusters would be moving to the Indoor Football League for the 2010 season. Owner Randy Sanders applied for his team's spot in the Indoor Football League (IFL) and they were accepted as an expansion franchise. It was announced on January 28, 2010, that the Dusters would have to be renamed, because the Arena Football League owned the rights to the Dusters' name and logo. On February 8, the new Amarillo Venom name and logo was unveiled.

2011 season

Move to the LSFL (2012–2014)
In August 2011, the Venom were sold to local couple Stephanie and Toby Tucker, with Stephanie taking on the role of general manager. For the 2012 season, the Venom joined the Lone Star Football League (LSFL). In their inaugural season in the LSFL they won the 2012 championship. Under the leadership of quarterback Nate Davis and coach Julian Reese, the Venom finished the 2013 season with a 9–3 record. In the playoffs, the finished off the Abilene Bombers, 70–40.

On July 13, 2013, they faced the Laredo Rattlesnakes, where they won 70–69, winning back-to-back championships in the LSFL. Davis won the MVP of the Game.

Champions Indoor Football (2015–2020)
In 2014, after the completion of their third season in the LSFL, the league merged with Champions Professional Indoor Football League to become Champions Indoor Football. The Venom qualified for the playoffs in each of the next five seasons, including making it to the 2016 championship game where they lost to the Wichita Force 48–45. Prior to the start of the 2020 season, the onset of the COVID-19 pandemic caused the season to be cancelled.

Lone Star Series and Arena Football Association (2021–2022)
The 2021 season was then delayed, but the local capacity and interstate travel restrictions in Texas led the Venom and the West Texas Warbirds to withdraw from participating in the 2021 CIF season. The Venom and Warbirds instead launched the Lone Star Series, a series of games between the two CIF Texas teams and a few other Texas-based semiprofessional teams. Amarillo lost the series championship game to West Texas, 79–60.

Amarillo and West Texas officially left the CIF and turned their Lone Star Series from the previous season into the Arena Football Association (AFA) in November 2021. The new league also announced its initial membership consisting of former Lone Star Series member Texas Jets, former American Arena League champions North Texas Bulls, the dormant Rio Grande Valley Dorados, and the Texas Crude.

On February 17, 2022, team co-owner Stephanie Tucker announced the team had withdrawn from participating in the AFA for the 2022 season and that the team was for sale.

Season-by-season

|-
| colspan="6" align="center" | Amarillo Dusters (Intense)
|-
|2004 || 13 || 3 || 0 || 1st League || Won Round 1 (S.A. Stampede 41–29)Won Intense Bowl I (L. Lone Stars 62–47)
|-
| colspan="6" align="center" | Amarillo Dusters (af2)
|-
|2005 || 8 || 8 || 0 || 4th NC Midwest || Won NC Round 1 (Oklahoma City 59–56)Lost Semifinals (Memphis 30–71)
|-
|2006 || 4 || 12 || 0 || 5th NC Midwest || 
|-
|2007 || 3 || 13 || 0 || 4th NC Central || 
|-
|2008 || 8 || 8 || 0 || 3rd NC Central || Won NC Round 1 (Tulsa 65–62)Won NC Semifinals (Bossier-Shreveport 59–45) Lost NC Championship (Spokane 49–79)
|-
|2009 || 3 || 13 || 0 || 3rd NC Central || 
|-
| colspan="6" align="center" | Amarillo Venom (IFL)
|-
|2010 || 11 || 3 || 0 || 1st IC Lonestar West || Won IC Round 1 (West Texas 56–36)Lost IC Semifinals (Arkansas 31–46)
|-
|2011 || 4 || 10 || 0 || 3rd Lonestar || 
|-
| colspan="6" align="center" | Amarillo Venom (LSFL)
|-
|2012 || 10 || 4 || 0 || 1st League || Won Round 1 (West Texas 56–42)Won Lone Star Bowl I (Rio Grande Valley 62–40)
|-
|2013 || 7 || 5 || 0 || 2nd League || Won LSFL Semifinals (Abilene 70–42)Won Lone Star Bowl II (Laredo 70–69)
|-
|2014 || 5 || 7 || 0 || — || —
|-
| colspan="6" align="center" | Amarillo Venom (CIF)
|-
|2015 || 7 || 5 || 0 || 6th League || Lost Semifinals (Sioux City 52–83)
|-
|2016 || 8 || 4 || 0 || 2nd Southern || Won Southern Wildcard (Dodge City 98–56)Won Southern Championship (Texas 57–53)Lost Champions Bowl II (Wichita 48–45)
|-
|2017 || 9 || 3 || 0 || 1st South || Won South Conference Semifinal (Duke City 70–41)Lost Southern Conference Championship (Texas 71–77)
|-
|2018 || 8 || 4 || 0 || 2nd South || Lost Conference Semifinal (Texas 45–56)
|-
|2019 || 8 || 4 || 0 || 2nd South || Lost Conference Championship (Duke City 62–70)
|-
|2020 || colspan=5; align=left |Season cancelled due to COVID-19 pandemic
|-
|2021 || 3 || 2 || 0 || 2nd Lone Star Series|| Won semifinal (Texas Jets 49–15)Lost Lone Star Series Championship (West Texas 60–79)
|-
!Totals || 134 || 125 || 0 ||colspan="2"| (including playoffs)
|}

Players

Roster

Awards and honors

Notes

External links
 Official website
 Amarillo Dusters at ArenaFan
 Final Standings of the Dusters' Only Year In The IFL
 2008 af2 Stats

 
Intense Football League teams
Af2 teams
Arena Football League in Texas
Former Indoor Football League teams
Lone Star Football League teams
Champions Indoor Football teams
Defunct American football teams in Texas
Sports in Amarillo, Texas
American football teams established in 2003
American football teams disestablished in 2022
2003 establishments in Texas
2022 disestablishments in Texas